The following are lists of television programs by episode count.

 List of television programs by episode count
 List of animated television series by episode count
List of anime series by episode count
List of anime franchises by episode count

Episode count